The 2016–17 ACB season, also known as Liga Endesa for sponsorship reasons, was the 34th season of the Spanish basketball league. It started on 30 September 2016 with the first round of the regular season and ended on 16 June 2017 with the ACB Finals. Real Madrid was the defending champion, but lost the title to Valencia Basket in the finals, which won its first league ever.

Teams

Promotion and relegation (pre-season)
A total of 18 teams contested the league, including 16 sides from the 2015–16 season and two promoted from the 2015–16 LEB Oro. ACB agreed with Ourense Provincia Termal its promotion to this season instead the previous one if it fulfills successfully the requirements.
Teams promoted from LEB OroOurense Provincia Termal (did not fulfill the requirements)
Quesos Cerrato Palencia (resigned to promote due to the impossibility to fulfill the requirements, its place was offered Movistar Estudiantes)
Club Melilla Baloncesto (resigned to promote due to the impossibility to fulfill the requirements, its place was offered RETAbet.es GBC, which resigned to it and finally agreed to play in LEB Oro)

After the resignation of RETAbet.es GBC to play in ACB, the ACB offered its place to Quesos Cerrato Palencia and Club Melilla Baloncesto to complete a league of 18 teams. After both teams refused the invitation, the ACB agreed to play a 17-team league. On 27 September 2016, the league confirmed that the two last qualified teams will be relegated to LEB Oro.

Venues and locations

Personnel and sponsorship

Notes
1. Cultura del Esfuerzo is the motto of the club.

Managerial changes

Regular season

League table

Positions by round
The table lists the positions of teams after completion of each round. In italics, the team did not play any game in that round.

Source: ACB

Results

Playoffs

Final standings

Attendances
Attendances include playoff games:

Awards
All official awards of the 2016–17 ACB season'''.

MVP

Source:

Finals MVP

Source:

All-ACB Teams

Source:

Best Young Player Award

Source:

Best All-Young Team

Source:

Sportium Award to the Best Three-Point Shooter

Source:

KIA Most Spectacular Player

Source:

Best Coach

Source:

Player of the week

Source:

Player of the month

Source:

ACB clubs in European competitions

References and notes

External links
 Official website 
 linguasport.com 

   
  
Spanish
Liga ACB seasons